Newmarket may refer to:

Geography

Australia
Newmarket, Queensland
 Newmarket Air Raid Shelter
Newmarket railway station, Brisbane
Newmarket State School
Newmarket State High School
Newmarket railway station, Melbourne
Big_Stable_Newmarket, a heritage listed stable in Sydney

Canada
Newmarket, Ontario
Newmarket Bus Terminal
Newmarket GO Station, a station in the GO Transit network located in the town
Newmarket High School, a secondary school
Newmarket Hurricanes, a defunct Tier II Junior "A" ice hockey team
Newmarket Transit, a defunct transit system now merged with York Region Transit
Newmarket Royals, a defunct junior ice hockey team
Newmarket Saints, a defunct minor league hockey team

Ireland
Newmarket, County Cork
Newmarket-on-Fergus, in County Clare

New Zealand
Newmarket, New Zealand, an Auckland suburb
Newmarket Railway Station, New Zealand, the local train station
Newmarket Viaduct, a major motorway bridge

United Kingdom

England
Newmarket, Suffolk, the global centre of thoroughbred horse racing
Newmarket Racecourse
Newmarket, Gloucestershire, a location

Wales
The name for the village of Trelawnyd, Flintshire, between 1710 and 1954

Scotland
Newmarket, Lewis, in the Outer Hebrides

United States
Newmarket, Missouri, an unincorporated community in Marion County
Newmarket, New Hampshire, a town in Rockingham County
Newmarket (CDP), New Hampshire, the main village in the town
Newmarket station (MBTA), a commuter rail station in Boston

Other uses
Newmarket Films
Newmarket Handicap, an Australian horse race
Newmarket sausage, a traditional product from the town in Suffolk
NewMarket Corporation, a US chemical company
Newmarket (card game), a card game based on Pope Joan

See also
Neumarkt (disambiguation), several places in German-speaking areas
New Market (disambiguation)
Nieuwmarkt, a square in Amsterdam
Morning coat, once known as a Newmarket coat
Novi Pazar, a Serbian town whose name means "New Bazaar"
Novi Pazar, Shumen Province, a Bulgarian town whose name means "New Bazaar"